USS Lynch is a name used more than once by the U.S. Navy:

 ,  a fishing schooner chartered by order of General George Washington 26 January 1776.
 , an oceanographic research ship acquired by the U.S. Navy in 1965 and scrapped in 2001

United States Navy ship names